Kalegaun is a village located in Bheri municipality in Jajarkot District of Karnali Province of Nepal. The aerial distance from Kalegaun to Nepal's capital Kathmandu is approximately 324 km.

Education

Shiva Byawasaik Secondary School is the first vocational school in Jajarkot District.

Notable people
Notable people born in Kalegaun include:
 Shakti Bahadur Basnet, politician

Temples

There are several temples in Kalegaun. Shivalaya temple in Kalegaun located at the side of Bheri River is famous in Jajarkot.

See also 
 List of monuments in Jajarkot, Nepal

References

External links

Villages in Jajarkot District
Populated places in Jajarkot District